Ticinosuchus is an extinct genus of suchian archosaur from the Middle Triassic (Anisian - Ladinian) of Switzerland and Italy.

Description
These scutes were sometimes considered to have been staggered, alternating between several rows. However, some studies refute this claim, instead purporting that the scutes were aligned in neat rows, with a one-to-one assignment of scutes to vertebrae. The structure of the hips shows that its legs were placed under the body almost vertically. Coupled with the development of a calcaneus and a specialized ankle joint, this would have made Ticinosuchus a fast runner, unlike most earlier reptiles.
Ticinosuchus is thought to be very close to or possible even the same species that made the Cheirotherium trace fossils found in Germany. It too shows a narrow track-way, similar to that of Ticinosuchus. It is one of the most famous fossils of Besano.

Fish scales have been preserved in the abdomen of the specimen. This was likely indicative of a piscivorous diet. Ticinosuchus shares many similarities with paracrocodylomorphs, such as certain adaptations of the ischium and possibly (but not certainly) hyposphene-hypantrum articulations.

References

 Krebs, B. (1965). Ticinosuchus ferox nov. gen. nov. sp. Ein neuer Pseudosuchier aus der Trias des Monte San Giorgio. Neues Jahrbuch fur Geologie und Paläontology, Abhandlungen 81: 1–140.
 Sill, W.D. (1974). The anatomy of Saurosuchus galilei and the relationships of the rauisuchid thecodonts. Bulletin of the Museum of Comparative Zoology 146: 317–362.

Paracrocodylomorphs
Triassic reptiles of Europe
Prehistoric pseudosuchian genera